The 2016 San Francisco Board of Supervisors elections occurred on November 8, 2016. Six of the eleven seats of the San Francisco Board of Supervisors were contested in this election. Three incumbents were termed out of office and three ran for reelection.

Municipal elections in California are officially non-partisan, though most candidates in San Francisco do receive funding and support from various political parties. The election was held using ranked-choice voting.

Results

District 1 

This district consists of the Richmond. Incumbent supervisor Eric Mar could not seek re-election due to term limits.

District 3 

District 3 consists of the northeastern corner of San Francisco, including Chinatown, the Financial District, Fisherman's Wharf, Nob Hill, North Beach, and Telegraph Hill.

District 5 

District 5 consists of the Fillmore, Haight-Ashbury, Hayes Valley, Japantown, UCSF, and the Western Addition. Incumbent supervisor London Breed ran for re-election.

District 7 

District 7 consists of City College, Forest Hill, Lake Merced, Mount Davidson, Parkmerced, San Francisco State University, St. Francis Wood, and Twin Peaks.

District 9 

District 9 consists of Bernal Heights, the Inner Mission, and the Portola. Incumbent supervisor David Campos could not run for re-election due to term limits.

District 11 

District 11 consists of Crocker-Amazon, the Excelsior, Ingleside, Oceanview, and the Outer Mission. Incumbent supervisor John Avalos could not run for re-election due to term limits.

References

External links 
City and County of San Francisco Department of Elections

San Francisco Board of Supervisors
Board of Supervisors 2016